Visual system homeobox 2 is a protein that in humans is encoded by the VSX2 gene.

References

Further reading